Acute may refer to:

Language
 Acute accent, a diacritic used in many modern written languages
 Acute (phonetic), a perceptual classification

Science and mathematics
 Acute angle
 Acute triangle
 Acute, a leaf shape in the glossary of leaf morphology
 Acute (medicine), a disease that it is of short duration and of recent onset.
 Acute toxicity, the adverse effects of a substance from a single exposure or in a short period of time

See also
 Acutance, in photography, subjective perception of sharpness related to the edge contrast of an image
 Acuity (disambiguation)